The New Zealand women's national rugby union team, also known as the Black Ferns, have played 38 matches so far in eight of nine Women's Rugby World Cup tournaments in 1991, and from 1998 to 2021. They did not participate in the 1994 World Cup in Scotland due to a late cancellation. 

They have won the 1998, 2002, 2006, 2010, 2017, and the 2021 tournaments. They are the only team to have won four back-to-back World Cup's — 1998 to 2010. Their worst performance was in 2014 when they lost their only match in the pool stage to Ireland and missed out on the semi-finals for the first time. They have made it to at least the semi-finals at all the other tournaments.

New Zealand hosted their first Women's Rugby World Cup which washeld from 8 October to 12 November 2022 in Auckland and Whangārei. The tournament was originally scheduled to be held in 2021, but was postponed due to the COVID-19 pandemic. It was the first time that a country in the Southern Hemisphere has ever hosted a Rugby World Cup. The Black Ferns won their sixth title after defeating England in the final.

By position

1991 Rugby World Cup

Pool Stage

Cup Semi-final

1998 Rugby World Cup

Pool Stage

Knockout stage 
Quarter-final

Semi-final

Final

2002 Rugby World Cup

Pool Stage

Knockout stage 
Semi-final

Final

2006 Rugby World Cup

Pool Stage

Knockout stage 
Semi-final

Final

2010 Rugby World Cup

Pool Stage

Knockout stage 
Semi-final

Final

2014 Rugby World Cup

Pool Stage

Knockout stage 
5th–8th Place Playoff (Semi-final)

5th Place Playoff

2017 Rugby World Cup

Pool Stage

Knockout stage 
Semi-final

Final

2021 Rugby World Cup

Pool Stage

Knockout stage 

Quarter-final

Semi-final

Final

Overall record 
Overall record against all nations in the World Cup:

References

External links 

 Official site of the Rugby World Cup.
 Official site of World Rugby.

 
World Cup